Yermakovskaya is a rural locality (a village) in Ilezskoye Rural Settlement, Tarnogsky District, Vologda Oblast, Russia. The population was 11 as of 2002.

Geography 
Yermakovskaya is located 39 km northeast of Tarnogsky Gorodok (the district's administrative centre) by road. Stepushino is the nearest rural locality.

References 

Rural localities in Tarnogsky District